Yurkevich is a gender-neutral Slavic surname that may refer to
Aleksandr Yurkevich (1942–2011), Russian Olympic wrestler
Darya Yurkevich (born 1988), Belarusian biathlete
Natalya Yurkevich (born 1967), Kazakhstani dressage rider
Pamfil Yurkevich (1826–1874), Russian philosopher
Vladimir Yurkevich (1885–1964), Russian naval engineer